Brett Maher (born November 21, 1989) is an American football placekicker for the Dallas Cowboys of the National Football League (NFL). He was signed by the New York Jets as an undrafted free agent in 2013. He played college football at Nebraska. He has also been a member of the Dallas Cowboys, Winnipeg Blue Bombers, Ottawa Redblacks, Hamilton Tiger-Cats, Cleveland Browns, Washington Commanders, Houston Texans, and Arizona Cardinals.

Early years
Maher attended Centennial Public Schools in Utica, Nebraska for his first three years of high school before transferring to Kearney High School, where he played high school football for the Bearcats.

As a senior, he made 8-of-14 field goals, 41 of 46 extra points, and averaged 41.1 yards per punt. He also played wide receiver, posting 775 receiving yards and 10 touchdowns. He received All-state honors from the Lincoln Journal Star and Omaha World-Herald at the end of the season.

In basketball, he was an honorable-mention Class A all-state pick as a senior. In track, he won the long jump and pole vault state championships as a senior, setting a state record in the latter.

College career
Maher turned down other football scholarship offers to walk-on at the University of Nebraska. As a redshirt freshman and as a sophomore, he appeared in all games as the holder for field goals and extra points, while also serving as the backup punter behind Alex Henery.

As a junior, he was named the starter at placekicker and punter after Henery graduated. He made 19-of-23 field goals, 43-of-44 extra points and averaged 44.5 yards per punt (sixth in school history). He received Big Ten Special Teams Player of the Week honors three times, while being named Eddleman-Fields Big Ten Punter of the Year and Bakken-Andersen Big Ten Kicker of the Year. He became one of the few specialists in Big Ten history to be named All-Conference both at kicker and punter in the same season.

As a senior, the school awarded him with a football scholarship. He made 20-of-27 field goals, all of his 59 extra point attempts, 57 touchbacks out of 96 kickoffs, and averaged 41.8 yards per punt. His 20 field goals ranked second in school history for a season, and his 119 points set a record for most points scored by a kicker. He ranked third overall in conference in scoring and first among kickers. He received the Bakken-Andersen Big Ten Kicker-of-the-Year Award for the second straight year.

He finished his career with 39-of-50 made field goals (78%), 219 points, 120 punts for a 43.2-yard average and 43 punts inside the 20-yard line.

Collegiate statistics

Professional career

New York Jets
Maher was signed as an undrafted free agent by the New York Jets after the 2013 NFL Draft on May 12, earning the contract following a rookie minicamp tryout. He was waived on July 23, to make room for placekicker Billy Cundiff.

Dallas Cowboys
On August 11, 2013, Maher was signed by the Dallas Cowboys, to play in the preseason while Dan Bailey recovered from an injury. He was released two weeks later on August 27.

Winnipeg Blue Bombers
On May 1, 2014, Maher signed a contract with the Winnipeg Blue Bombers of the Canadian Football League (CFL). He played in two pre-season games for the Bombers before being released by the team due to the restrictions on the number of national and international players on the team's roster; the team kept their Canadian incumbent (Lirim Hajrullahu).

Ottawa Redblacks
A few weeks after being released by Winnipeg, he signed with the Ottawa Redblacks. In week four of the season, Maher was named the CFL's Special Teams Player of the Week after going 6-for-6 on field goals, scoring all the Redblacks' points in an 18–17 decision over the Toronto Argonauts. The victory marked the expansion club's first-ever win. On May 13, 2015, he was released by the Redblacks because of a hip injury he suffered in the prior month, before the start of training camp. He missed all but 4 games during the season due to the injury.

Hamilton Tiger-Cats
On May 19, 2016, Maher signed with the Hamilton Tiger-Cats after taking part in a team mini-camp. He completed 82% of his field goal attempts that season, going 41-for-50, and had a punt average of 45.9 yards.

Cleveland Browns
On March 20, 2017, Maher signed with the Cleveland Browns. 
On May 2, he was released after not being able to pass rookie Zane Gonzalez on the depth chart.

Ottawa Redblacks (second stint)
On June 10, 2017, Maher signed with the Ottawa Redblacks. He achieved the same completion percentage as the previous season in Hamilton (82%), recording the same amount of field goals (41) on 50 attempts. His punt average was 46.7 yards.

Dallas Cowboys (second stint)

2018 season
On April 4, 2018, Maher signed with the Dallas Cowboys, to limit the off-season workload of Dan Bailey. He was 4 out of 5 field goal attempts in preseason, which included two 45-yarders and a 57-yard field goal. On September 1, in a surprise move, the Cowboys released Bailey, making Maher the team's kicker to start the season. His NFL debut came in the season opener against the Carolina Panthers, where he missed his first career field goal attempt (47 yards). He would then go on to make fifteen straight field goal attempts.

In Week 4, Maher kicked all four field goals (32, 43, 22, and 38 yards), including a 38-yard game-winner as time expired, in a 26–24 comeback win over the Detroit Lions, earning him NFC Special Teams Player of the Week. On October 14 in a game against the Jacksonville Jaguars, Maher converted 4 field goals, including a 55-yarder which at the time was his career long and the second-longest field goal in AT&T Stadium behind Dan Bailey's 56-yard field goal. From Week 7 to Week 11, he missed either a field goal or an extra point in 4 straight games.

On November 18, Maher kicked a 48-yard game-winning field goal to beat the Atlanta Falcons. On December 9, 2018, Maher kicked a new career-long 62-yard field goal against the Philadelphia Eagles as time expired in the first half. The field goal also set a franchise record and tied for the third-longest in NFL history.

In Week 16, Maher converted two field goals (including the second longest in franchise history-59 yards) and three extra points in a 27–20 win over the Tampa Bay Buccaneers, earning him NFC Special Teams Player of the Week. He made 5-of-8 (63%) field goal attempts in the final 4 games (not including playoffs), missing a field goal in three of the last 4 games.

He finished with 29-of-36 field goals (80.6%), 32-of-33 extra points and 67.5% touchbacks of his kickoffs. He ranked eighth in the league with 29 field goals and tied for most field goals of at least 50 yards (6), which also tied a franchise record for a single-season. He was 25th in field goal percentage and tied for 11th in the league in accuracy from 40–49 yards (7-of-11).

2019 season
In 2019, Maher struggled with his accuracy during the preseason, but the team showed confidence on his ability by not bringing another kicker to compete with him. On October 13, in a loss against the New York Jets, Maher became the first kicker in NFL history to have two made field goals of 62 or more yards in a career. On October 6, he made one out of 3 field goal attempts against the Green Bay Packers.

On October 20, Maher set a new career long and broke his own Cowboys franchise record when he scored a 63-yard field goal against the Philadelphia Eagles. On the game, he converted all four of his extra points and all three of his field goals, earning him NFC Special Teams Player of the Week. Maher kept struggling during the season with accuracy issues, but the team was patient, waiting for him to play through it. On November 28, he missed 2 field goals (one deflected) in the 15–26 loss against the Buffalo Bills.

On December 5, Maher missed a 42-yard field goal in the 31–24 loss against the Chicago Bears, his 10th miss of the season. Although he converted a 31-yard attempt in the final two minutes to cut the lead to 7 points, he also hit a kickoff out of bounds early in the fourth quarter, helping the Bears take over at their own 40-yard line. After the game he was quoted in the media as saying: "I felt like I hit every ball pretty well tonight. I'll put my head on the pillow tonight feeling good about what I did this week and moving forward".

On December 9, with the team experiencing a streak of three straight losses and in danger of missing the playoffs, Maher was released by the Cowboys due to accuracy concerns. He finished the season converting just 20-of-30 field goals (67%), 7-of-13 (54%) on attempts between 30 and 49 yards, missing at least one attempt in 8 of 13 games and making all 36 extra points. He also set NFL career (3) and single-season (2) records for most field goals made of over 60 yards. He was replaced by Kai Forbath.

New York Jets (second stint)
On December 31, 2019, the Jets signed Maher to a reserve/futures contract and was waived on August 31, 2020.

Washington Commanders
Maher signed with the practice squad of the Washington Commanders on September 10, 2020, before being released on September 30, 2020.

Houston Texans
On October 12, 2020, Maher was signed to the Houston Texans' practice squad. He was released on December 14, 2020.

Arizona Cardinals 
On December 25, 2020, Maher was signed to the Arizona Cardinals' practice squad. He signed a reserve/future contract on January 5, 2021. On March 20, 2021, Maher was waived after the Cardinals signed placekicker Matt Prater.

New Orleans Saints
On August 10, 2021, Maher signed with the New Orleans Saints. He was waived/injured on August 17 and placed on injured reserve. He was waived on August 21, 2021. He was re-signed to the practice squad on November 16. He was promoted to the active roster on November 19, 2021. In Week 13 against his former team, the Dallas Cowboys, Maher was 1-for-2 on field goal attempts as the Saints lost 27–17. In Week 15 against the Tampa Bay Buccaneers he was responsible for the only points in the game making all three of his field goal attempts in a 9-0 victory. He was waived again on February 22, 2022.

Dallas Cowboys (third stint)
On August 9, 2022, the Dallas Cowboys signed Maher after releasing Jonathan Garibay to compete for the kicking position with Lirim Hajrullahu. He was waived on August 30, 2022, and signed to the practice squad the next day. On September 17, 2022, the Cowboys promoted Maher from the practice squad. The very next day in the Cowboys' eventual win over the Cincinnati Bengals, Maher kicked a 50-yard field goal to seal the upset win. 

On September 26, 2022, Maher hit three field goals in a Monday Night Football game against the New York Giants. But before halftime he just missed left of the uprights from 59 yards out, giving him a 3-for-4 performance. 

On October 2, 2022, Maher hit all four field goals (53,45,28,29) against the Washington Commanders, although he did have an extra point blocked, his fourth extra point miss of his career. 

On November 20, 2022, Maher converted all four field goals against the Minnesota Vikings. One of those kicks was a 60+ yard field goal, that had not counted until the next time. Maher became the first kicker in NFL history to convert four field goals from 60 or more yards. Maher finished the season 29-of-32 on field goal attempts and 9-for-11 on 50+ yard field goals.

On January 16, 2023, Maher missed four of five extra point attempts during the Cowboys' Wild Card Game against the Tampa Bay Buccaneers, the most missed extra points in a game (regular season or playoffs) since extra points were first tracked in 1932. Maher was previously 50-of-53 on extra points in the 2022 regular season (with two of them blocked) and made 128-of-134 extra point attempts in his NFL career.

References

External links
Nebraska Cornhuskers bio

1989 births
Living people
People from Kearney, Nebraska
Players of American football from Nebraska
American football placekickers
American football punters
American players of Canadian football
Arizona Cardinals players
Canadian football placekickers
Canadian football punters
Nebraska Cornhuskers football players
New York Jets players
Dallas Cowboys players
Winnipeg Blue Bombers players
Ottawa Redblacks players
Hamilton Tiger-Cats players
Cleveland Browns players
Washington Football Team players
Houston Texans players
New Orleans Saints players